Hemileuca juno, the Juno buck moth, is an insect in the family Saturniidae. The species was first described by Alpheus Spring Packard in 1872. It is found in Central and North America.

The MONA or Hodges number for Hemileuca juno is 7735.

References

Further reading

 
 
 

Hemileucinae
Articles created by Qbugbot
Moths described in 1872